First Interstate Bank Center is a 4,000-permanent seat indoor arena located in Redmond, Oregon, as part of the Deschutes County Expo Center. It is named for a regional bank which purchased naming rights to the arena's name. Originally, it was called the Bank of the Cascades Center, but that bank's acquisition by First Interstate BancSystem caused the change to the current name. Other seating capacities include 5,000 for basketball and up to 7,800 for concerts. In addition to the aforemented events, First Interstate Bank Center can also accommodate volleyball, motorsports, wrestling, indoor football, conventions and trade shows. There is over 40,000 square feet of space on the arena floor with an additional 28,250 square feet on the arena concourse. Concession stands are placed on each end of the arena and ticket booths are located on each entrance.

The Three Sisters
Also located at the Deschutes County Expo Center is a conference center known as the Three Sisters. The Three Sisters contain 33,736 square feet of total space, with the largest, the Middle Sister containing 14,904 square feet and used for banquets, conferences and trade shows. The Middle Sister can accommodate 1,568 for smaller concerts. The other two sisters each have 9,416 square feet of space. A 5,000-square-foot kitchen is attached to the Three Sisters.

High Desert Activity Center
High Desert Activity Center is a 12,684-square-foot exhibit hall used primarily for trade shows.

Outdoor arenas
There are two outdoor arenas near the First Interstate Bank Center, the 3,500-seat Juniper Arena and the 1,500-seat Sagebrush Arena, both used for horse shows and rodeos

External links
Deschutes County Expo Center

References

Indoor arenas in Oregon
Convention centers in Oregon
Sports venues in Oregon
Buildings and structures in Redmond, Oregon
Basketball venues in Oregon
Volleyball venues in the United States
Rodeo venues in the United States